The 1946 Washington and Lee Generals football team was an American football team that represented Washington and Lee University as a member of the Southern Conference during the 1946 college football season. In its first season under head coach Art Lewis, the team compiled a 2–6 record (1–4 against conference opponents), finished in a tie for 13th place in the conference, and was outscored by a total of 149 to 118.

The team played its home games at Wilson Field in Lexington, Virginia.

Schedule

References

Washington and Lee
Washington and Lee Generals football seasons
Washington and Lee Generals football